Compass (often stylized as COMPASS), is a collaborative engineering team founded in 2006 in support of the LSAM (Lunar Surface Access Module) Design Study at NASA's Glenn Research Center in Cleveland, Ohio. The team primarily performs integrated vehicle systems analyses. The team is a logical extension of Glenn's long history of analysis and design of spacecraft. Compass conducts "studies," in which the team receives a request from a contractor to analyze a space system design. The group reviews the parameters of the design, conducts simulations, details the design, and drafts a final report. Working in real time among engineers and scientists with a wide breath of experience allows designs to come together quite rapidly. Compass designs spacecraft with lofty goals in mind; many of their projects seem like they have come out of a sci-fi film. An example of this is a nuclear-powered robot designed to burrow into Europa. Early success of the team allows it to continue to produce preliminary designs of spacecraft. The name "Compass" was originally based on an acronym that has since been deprecated (Collaborative Modeling for the Parametric Assessment of Space Systems).

History
The Compass team shares many similarities with the NASA Jet Propulsion Laboratory's Team X group and the NASA Goddard Spaceflight Center Integrated Design Center Team The computer program GLIDE was designed internally to support SSH data transfer across firewalls, and greatly supports the current capability of the team. The team formally became Compass in 2006 as a response to a multi-center Lunar Lander Concept Design study led by the NASA Johnson Space Center (JSC).

Projects
 Mars Ascent Vehicle (MAV), originally based on a Compass design in 2010.  A lightweight rocket has a launch platform on top of it. Samples from the surface of Mars are transported into orbit by the rocket, where a ship can collect them and return them to Earth.
 Nuclear electric propulsion spacecraft, developed in 2012. The idea is that the spacecraft could transport a team of 6 astronauts into orbit around Mars for 400 days, and then return them to Earth. An electric ion thruster, powered by a 2.5 megawatt nuclear reactor, would serve as the propulsion system
 Europa Cryobot was designed to tunnel deep through the ice of Jupiter's moon Europa to investigate life that might exist in the liquid ocean that lies underneath

References 

NASA